Asahiyama may refer to:

 Mount Asahi (Ishikari), a mountain in Asahikawa, Hokkaidō
 Asahiyama Zoo, a zoo in Asahikawa, Hokkaidō
 Kotonishiki Katsuhiro, also known as Asahiyama, head coach of the sumo stable Asahiyama
 Asahiyama stable, a now defunct sumo wrestling stable